Hyper–Rayleigh scattering Optical Activity, (a form of Chiroptical harmonic scattering) is a nonlinear optical physical effect whereby chiral scatterers (such as nanoparticles or molecules) convert light (or other electromagnetic radiation) to higher frequencies via harmonic generation processes, in a way that the intensity of generated light depends on the chirality of the scatterers. "Hyper–Rayleigh scattering" is a nonlinear optical counterpart to Rayleigh scattering. "Optical activity" refers to any changes in light properties (such as intensity or polarization) that are due to chirality.

History
The effect was theoretically predicted in 1979, in a mathematical description of hyper Raman scattering optical activity. Within this theoretical model, upon setting the initial and final frequencies of light to the same value, the mathematics describe the Hyper Rayleigh Scattering Optical Activity. The theory was well in advance of its time, and the effect remained elusive for 40 years. Its author David L. Andrews referred to it as the "Impossible Theory". However, in January 2019, an experimental demonstration was reported by Ventsislav K. Valev and his team. The team investigated the hyper Rayleigh scattering (at the second harmonic generation frequency) from chiral nanohelices made of silver. Valev and his team observed that the intensity of the hyper Rayleigh scattering light depended on the direction of circularly polarized light and that this dependence reversed with the chirality of the nanohelices. Valev's work unambiguously established that the effect is physically possible, opening the way for nonlinear chiroptical investigations of a variety of chiral light-scattering materials; including molecules, plasmonic metal nanoparticles and semiconductor nanoparticles.

Significance
Hyper Rayleigh Scattering Optical Activity (HRS OA) is arguably the most fundamental nonlinear chiral optical (chiroptical) effect; since other nonlinear chiroptical effects have additional requirements, which make them conceptually more involved, i.e. less fundamental. HRS OA is a scattering effect and therefore it does not require the frequency conversion process to be coherent; contrary to other nonlinear chiroptical effects, such as Second Harmonic Generation Circular Dichroism or Second Harmonic Generation Optical Rotation. Moreover, HRS OA is a parametric process (optics): the initial and final quantum mechanical states of the excited electron are the same. Because the excitation proceeds via virtual states, there is no restriction on the frequency of incident light. By contrast, other nonlinear scattering effects, such as two-photon circular dichroism and hyper-Raman are non-parametric - they require real energy states that restrict the frequencies at which these effects can be observed.

In molecules
Soon after the first demonstration of Hyper Rayleigh Scattering Optical Activity in metal nanoparticles, the effect was replicated in organic molecules, specifically aromatic oligoamide foldamers.

At the third harmonic
Whereas the initial experimental demonstration of hyper-Rayleigh scattering optical activity was observed at the second harmonic of the illumination frequency of light, the effect is general and can be observed at higher harmonics. The first demonstration of hyper Rayleigh scattering optical activity at the third harmonic was reported by Valev’s team in 2021, from sliver nanohelices.

See also

Linear dichroism
Magnetic circular dichroism
Optical activity
Optical isomerism
Optical rotation
Optical rotatory dispersion
Protein circular dichroism data bank
Two-photon circular dichroism
Vibrational circular dichroism
Raman optical activity (ROA)

References

External links
New physical effect demonstrated by University of Bath scientists after a 40 year search, official press release by the University of Bath.
Bath University has something to twist and shout about after 40-year search, by the EPSRC.
“Impossible” UEA physics theory proven in practice after 40 years, official press release by University of East Anglia.
Hyper-Rayleigh scattering, published in the scientific journal Nature Photonics.

Nonlinear optics
Scattering, absorption and radiative transfer (optics)
Chirality